Arto may refer to:

People

In the arts
 Arto Halonen (born 1964), Finnish documentary filmmaker
 Arto Järvelä (born 1964), Finnish fiddler and composer
 Arto Lindsay (born 1953), American musician Arthur Lindsay
 Arto Noras (born 1942), Finnish cellist
 Arto Paasilinna (1942–2018), Finnish writer and journalist
 Arto Saari (born 1981), Finnish professional skateboarder and photographer
 Arto Tchakmaktchian (1933–2019), Canadian-Armenian sculptor and painter
 Arto Tunçboyacıyan (born 1957), Turkish-born avant-garde folk musician

In politics
 Arto Aas (born 1980), Estonian politician
 Arto Pirttilahti (born 1963), Finnish politician
 Arto Satonen (born 1966), Finnish politician

In sport
 Arto Härkönen (born 1959), Finnish Olympic champion javelin thrower
 Arto Heiskanen (born 1963), Finnish former ice hockey player
 Arto Koivisto (born 1948), Finnish former cross-country skier
 Arto Koivisto (basketball) (1930–2016), Finnish basketball player
 Arto Lilja (born 1973), Finnish ski-orienteering competitor
 Arto Ruotanen (born 1961), Finnish retired ice hockey player
 Arto Saari (born 1981), Finnish professional skateboarder and photographer
 Arto Tolsa (1945–1989), Finnish footballer

In other fields
 Arto Räty (born 1955), Finnish retired lieutenant general
 Arto Salomaa (born 1934), Finnish mathematician and computer scientist

Places
 Artò, a frazione (and parish) of the municipality of Madonna del Sasso, Piedmont, Italy
 Arto, Sevnica, a settlement in the municipality of Sevnica in Slovenia
 Arto, Spain, a village

Music
 Arto Records, a 1920s record label
 "Arto" (song), a hidden track on the System of a Down album Toxicity

Estonian masculine given names
Finnish masculine given names